Bellium minutum also known as the miniature daisy, is a species of flowering plant in the genus Bellium. It is endemic to Sicily, Turkey, Cyprus and the islands in the north western part of the Aegean Sea.

References

Astereae
Plants described in 1771
Taxa named by Carl Linnaeus
Flora of Turkey
Flora of Sicily
Flora of Cyprus